This is a list of counts of the County of Comminges.

Counts of Comminges

House of Comminges

Aznar I-Sanche was created Count of Gascony by Pepin I, King of Aquitaine, around 820.  He made his son Garcia Aznar Viscount of Comminges in 833. When his father died in 836, Garcia Aznar became Count of Comminges and Couseran.

House of Lescun

In 1462, the king of France Louis XI detached the county of Comminges from the royal domain and gave it to his friend.

 1462–1472 : Jean de Lescun (illegitimate son of Arnaud-Guillaume of Lescun, bishop of Aire, and of Anne of Armagnac, born ? – died 1472, known as the Bastard of Armagnac, Marshal of France)

House of Aydie

At the death of John of Lescun in 1472, the county of Comminges passed to:

 1472–1498 : Odet of Aydie (husband of Marie of Lescun, heiress of Lescun as daughter of Mathieu of Lescun, himself probably a cousin of John of Lescun, born c. 1425 – died 1498, constable of France, supreme commander of the French army and close advisor of Louis XI)

''In 1498, at the death of Odet of Aydie, who did not have a son, king Louis XII of France definitely reunited the county of Comminges to the French crown. The descendants of Odet of Aydie's daughter continued to carry the title of count of Comminges.

House of Foix-Lautrec

 Jean of Foix-Lautrec, count of Comminges (1472–1494).
 Odet de Cominges, count of Comminges, Marshal of France (1494–1528).
 Enrique de Foix-Lautrec, count of Comminges (1528–1540).
 Claudia de Foix-Lautrec, contesse of Rethel, of Cominges, of Beaufort in Champagne, vicecontesse of Lautrec (1540–1553).

House of La-Barthe

 Paul of La Barthe, lord of Termes in Couserans, Marshal of France. count of Comminges (1552–1565).

House of Comminges-Guitaut

 Gaston of Comminges, count of Comminges (1638–1670).
 Louis of Comminges, count of Comminges (1670–1712).

House of Comminges-Lastronque

 Roger James of Comminges, count of Comminges (1718–1785).
 Roger Louis of Comminges, count of Comminges (1785–1789).
 Roger Aymeric of Comminges, count of Comminges (1789–1840).

House of Comminges-Saint-Lary

 Elie de Comminges-Péguilhan, count of Comminges and Baron Saint-Lary (1840–1894).
 Aimery Elie de Comminges-Péguilhan, count of Comminges and Baron Saint-Lary (1894–1925).
 Bertrand de Comminges-Péguilhan, count of Comminges (1925–1987).
 Jean-Odon de Comminges-Péguilhan, count of Comminges (1987–2015).

References

External links
 Counts of Comminges. Genealogy

 
Comminges

de:Haus Comminges